Bocskai Football Club was a Hungarian football club from the town of Debrecen.

History
Bokcskai FC won the 1929-30 Magyar Kupa season by beating Szegedi Bástya 5–1 in the final at Üllői úti stadion in Budapest.

Honours
Hungarian Cup:
 Winners (1) :1929–30

References

External links
 Profil

Football clubs in Hungary
1926 establishments in Hungary